The Netherlands Antilles competed at the 2000 Summer Olympics in Sydney, Australia.

Athletics

Equestrian

Sailing

Swimming

Triathlon

See also
 Netherlands Antilles at the 1999 Pan American Games

References
Official Olympic Reports

Nations at the 2000 Summer Olympics
Olympics
2000 Summer Olympics